Naan Sigappu Manithan may refer to:
Naan Sigappu Manithan (1985 film), a Tamil film starring Rajinikanth
Naan Sigappu Manithan (2014 film), a Tamil film starring Vishal